Jarama is a river in central Spain. It flows north to south, and passes east of Madrid where the El Atazar Dam is built on a tributary, the Lozoya River. It flows into the river Tagus in Aranjuez. The Manzanares is a tributary of the Jarama.

The Jarama in history 

The Jarama was the scene of fierce fighting in 1937 during the Spanish Civil War. Nationalist forces crossed the river in an attempt to cut the main road from Madrid to the Republican capital at Valencia. Nationalist forces led by Spanish Legionnaires and Moroccan soldiers (Regulares) of the Army of Africa were confronted by forces from the Republic including the 15th International Brigade.

The song Jarama Valley, with lyrics referencing the battle, became popular among the Republican battalions.

In fiction
El Jarama is a 1955 novel by Rafael Sánchez Ferlosio about a group of working-class youngsters from Madrid meeting for a picnic by the river on a summer day. Its realistic dialog renovated Spanish novels, and it won the Premio Nadal (Nadal Prize) in 1955.

See also 
 List of rivers of Spain
 There's a Valley in Spain called Jarama (Song)

References

External links
 

 
Rivers of the Community of Madrid
Rivers of Spain
Tributaries of the Tagus
Rivers of Castilla–La Mancha